Tillo District is a district of Siirt Province in Turkey which has the town of Tillo as its seat. The district had a population of 4,272 in 2021.

The district was established in 1990.

Settlements 
The district encompasses the municipality of Tillo, six villages and five hamlets.

Villages 

 Akyayla
 Fersaf
 Hatrant
 İkizbağlar
 Sinep
 Taşbalta

References 

Districts of Siirt Province